Tafurs were a group of participants of the First Crusade, under the Franks. Zealots following strict oaths of poverty, they are said to have committed acts of cannibalism during the Siege of Antioch.

Background 
The Tafurs took their name from a horseless Norman knight, who assumed the organization and armed leadership of peasants gathered by the preaching and spiritual leadership of Peter the Hermit, and so became known as "King Tafur". "Tafur" appears to mean just "beggar" or "vagrant". "King Tafur" took harsh vows of poverty, relinquished his weapons and armour and donned a sack-cloth and a scythe, urging the rest of his followers to do the same.

Tafurs wore no shoes, little clothing and barely lived off roots or herbs, frequently exhibiting sores and bruises throughout their bodies and were kept separated from the rest of the Crusaders. They wielded clubs, knives, hatchets etc, but were not allowed to have money or sophisticated weapons, otherwise they'd be sent to fight with the regular army. Anything gained through plunder however, was legitimate, and in fact seen as validation of God's favour towards their poverty. Hence, they were viciously rapacious and ruthless in the search of spoils. 

Arguably, what made the Tafurs infamous was their disregard for danger and reported acts of cannibalism: as starvation befell the Crusader army in Antioch, the Tafurs showed little hesitation in consuming the bodies of fallen enemies. Indeed, the Muslims greatly dreaded the Tafurs, much more so than even the rest of the Crusaders. When the governor of Antioch appealed to the Crusaders' princes to restrain the Tafurs, the princes had to admit to having little sway over them. Most of the barons (with the notable exception of Bohemond of Taranto) seem to have held the Tafurs in contempt, and never mention them in 'official' accounts back to Europe. They are, however, featured in chronicles written from a lower social standpoint, such as the Dei gesta per Francos or popular epics such as the Chanson d'Antioche  

The Tafurs followed the Crusaders to Jerusalem, and participated in the siege of the city in 1099.

Notes

References
Conor Kostick (2008): The Social Structure of the First Crusade, Brill, Boston.
Robert Payne (2000): The Dream and the Tomb: A History of the Crusades, Cooper Square Press, New York.
Norman Cohn (1970):  The Pursuit of the Millennium: Revolutionary Millenarians and Mystical Anarchists of the Middle Ages, Oxford University Press, New York.

Christians of the First Crusade
Cannibalism in Asia
French cannibals